Società Aerea Mediterranea (SAM) was an Italian cargo and passenger airline based in Rome, Italy, which operated between 1928 and 1939 as subsidiary of Ala Littoria and between 1959 and 1981 as subsidiary of Alitalia. It was founded on 26 March 1928 as a government initiative of the Secretary of State for Air Italo Balbo with the aim to take the control of all private airline and rationalize all domestic and international routes.

It was relaunched on 3 December 1959 as a non-IATA Alitalia subsidiary to operate IT flights, together with local cargo and secondary domestic passenger services on behalf of the parent company. The latter were transferred to Aero Trasporti Italiani in 1964 and the company concentrated on charter operations introducing jet service in 1968. SAM ceased operations at the end of 1976 and was put on liquidation on 1981.

Historical fleet

Pre-WWII fleet
Breda Ba.44
CANT 22
Savoia-Marchetti S.55
Savoia-Marchetti S.63

"Alitalia" period fleet
Curtiss-Wright C-46 Commando
Douglas DC-3
Douglas DC-6
Sud Aviation Caravelle

Accidents
8 March 1962: A Douglas DC-6B I-DIMO returning to the Leonardo da Vinci-Fiumicino Airport from the Khartoum International Airport crashed against the Monte Velino. All 5 crew members died in the accident, which may have been caused by interference on beacon from some transmitting stations.

External links

SAM on timetableimages.com

1928 establishments in Italy
1981 disestablishments in Italy
Defunct airlines of Italy
Companies based in Rome
Airlines established in 1928
Airlines disestablished in 1981
Alitalia
Defunct seaplane operators